The Webbs Creek, a perennial stream of the Hawkesbury-Nepean catchment, is located in the Outer Metropolitan Sydney region of New South Wales, Australia.

Course
The Webbs Creek (officially designated as a river) rises below the Womerah Range, near the Devils Hole in remote country within the Parr State Conservation Area. The river descends  over its  course.

See also

 List of rivers of Australia
 List of rivers in New South Wales (L-Z)
 Rivers of New South Wales
 Webbs Creek Ferry

References

Hawkesbury River
Rivers of New South Wales
City of Hawkesbury